Canistropsis albiflora is a species of flowering plant in the genus Canistropsis.

This bromeliad is endemic to the Atlantic Forest biome (Mata Atlantica Brasileira) within Bahia and Espírito Santo states, located in southeastern Brazil.

References

albiflora
Endemic flora of Brazil
Flora of the Atlantic Forest
Flora of Bahia
Flora of Espírito Santo
Vulnerable flora of South America